4-Aminoacridine is an aminoacridine.

See also
 2-Aminoacridine
 3-Aminoacridine
 9-Aminoacridine

References

Aromatic amines
Acridines